is a passenger railway station in located in the city of Kadoma, Osaka Prefecture, Japan, operated by the private railway company Keihan Electric Railway.

Lines
Nishisansō Station is served by the  Keihan Main Line, and is located 9.4 km from the starting point of the line at Yodoyabashi Station.

Station layout
The station has two elevated side side platforms, with the station building underneath.

Platforms

Adjacent stations

History
The station was opened on March 23, 1975

Passenger statistics
In fiscal 2019, the station was used by an average of 22,713 passengers daily (boarding passengers only).

Surrounding area
Panasonic headquarters
Panasonic Museum Konosuke Matsushita History Museum

References

External links

Official home page 

Railway stations in Japan opened in 1975
Railway stations in Osaka Prefecture
Kadoma, Osaka